is a Japanese politician of the New Komeito Party, a member of the House of Councillors in the Diet (national legislature). A native of Mii District, Fukuoka and graduate of Soka University, he worked at Nishinippon Shimbun from 1975 to 1988 as a reporter. He was elected to the House of Councillors for the first time in 1989.

References

External links 
 Official website in Japanese.

Members of the House of Councillors (Japan)
Living people
1952 births
New Komeito politicians
Sōka University alumni